Dixon Technologies is an Indian multinational electronics manufacturing services company, based in Noida. It is a contract manufacturer of televisions, washing machines, smartphones, LED bulbs, battens, downlighters and CCTV security systems for companies such as Samsung, Xiaomi, Panasonic and Philips. It has 17 manufacturing units in India. The company is listed on BSE and NSE since its initial public offering in 2017.

History
Dixon Technologies was founded in 1993 by Sunil Vachani. His father, Sundar Vachani. had been manufacturing televisions under the Weston brand which had launched the first colour television in India; his business struggled later on due to the emergence of other companies. Dixon initially manufactured 14-inch televisions, Sega video game consoles, Philips video recorders and push-button phones for Bharti Airtel. A major breakthrough came in the 2000s when the company won a Government contract to manufacture televisions. Apart from televisions and video recorders, the company also started to manufacture air conditioners and microwave ovens for LG Electronics, as well as DVD players for other brands.

In 2018, Dixon signed a deal with Xiaomi to manufacture LED television sets at its Tirupati plant.

In January 2020, Dixon entered a partnership with Samsung for local production of LED televisions. In December 2020, it was reported that Dixon's subsidiary Padget Electronics would manufacture smartphones for Motorola. In January 2021, Dixon announced that it would manufacture wireless speakers for the Indian company BoAt Lifestyle. Later that month, Padget Electronics signed a contract with HMD Global to manufacture Nokia smartphones at its Noida plant.

Operations 
Dixon has 17 manufacturing units in India with over 15,000 employees. It has India's largest manufacturing plants for LED televisions (in Tirupati), washing machines (in Dehradun) and LED bulbs (in Noida). The company manufactures/assembles goods such as home appliances, smartphone, laptops, televisions, set top box, medical electronics, lights, security surveillance system.

Joint ventures 
The company has joint ventures with:
 BoAt Lifestyle
 Rexxam
 Bharti Airtel

Customers
The following list consists of Dixon's present or past major customers

Xiaomi
Samsung
Motorola
BoAt Lifestyle
Panasonic
TCL Technology
OnePlus
Godrej
Wipro Enterprises
Havells
Bajaj
HMD Global (Nokia)
Syska
Philips
LG Electronics
Orient

See also
 Foxconn
 Make in India

References

External links

Electronics companies of India
Home appliance manufacturers of India
Indian companies established in 1993
1993 establishments in Uttar Pradesh
Companies listed on the National Stock Exchange of India
Companies listed on the Bombay Stock Exchange
Manufacturing companies based in Noida